Janetstown may refer to:
 Janetstown (near Thurso), a village in Highland, Scotland
 Janetstown, Wick, a district of the town of Wick, Highland, Scotland